Tamil Nadu Peasants and Workers Party (TNPWP) is a political party in the Indian state of Tamil Nadu. The president of TNPWP is Pon Kumar. TNPWP supported the All India Anna Dravida Munnetra Kazhagam (AIADMK) for 22 years, but the alliance broke down ahead of the 2006 Tamil Nadu assembly election. Instead the TNPWP aligned itself with the Samajwadi Party. After the elections, TNPWP pledged support to the Dravida Munnetra Kazhagam (DMK)-led Democratic Progressive Alliance government.

References

Political parties in Tamil Nadu
Political parties with year of establishment missing